Tal Wassit, also spelt Tal Wasat and Tall Waset, is a Syrian village located in Al-Ziyarah Nahiyah in Al-Suqaylabiyah District, Hama.  According to the Syria Central Bureau of Statistics (CBS), it had a population of 1254 in the 2004 census.

References 

Populated places in al-Suqaylabiyah District